Luis Cabeza de Vaca (died November 22, 1550) served as Bishop of Palencia, (1537–1550), Bishop of Salamanca (1530–1537), and Bishop of Islas Canarias (1523–1530).

Biography
On March 11, 1523 Pope Adrian VI appointed him Bishop of Islas Canarias. On June 22, 1530, Pope Clement VII appointed him Bishop of Salamanca. On April 14, 1537, Pope Paul III appointed him Bishop of Palencia. He died on November 22, 1550.

While Bishop, he was the principal consecrator of Jerónimo de Loaysa, Bishop of Cartagena (1538), and principal co-consecrator of Jorge de Austria, Bishop of Brixen (1539).

References

External links and additional sources
 (for Chronology of Bishops)
 (for Chronology of Bishops)
 (for Chronology of Bishops) 
 (for Chronology of Bishops) 

1550 deaths
Spanish bishops
Bishops appointed by Pope Adrian VI
Bishops appointed by Pope Clement VII
Bishops appointed by Pope Paul III